is a Japanese actor who has appeared in a number of feature films and television series. He is affiliated with Sun Music Production.

In December 9, 2016, he apprehended a voyeur criminal whose taking photographs of his wife's skirt using a smartphone, while Matsuda and his wife were shopping in Kumiyama Town, Kyoto Prefecture and heard his wife scream because of the voyeur.

Filmography

TV series

Films

References

External links
 Official profile at Sun Music Production 
 

Japanese male film actors
Japanese male television actors
1978 births
Living people
Male actors from Osaka
20th-century Japanese male actors
21st-century Japanese male actors